Gunhild Bergh (20 December 1888 – 10 September 1961) was a Swedish literary historian, travel writer, and newspaper journalist. She was the second Swedish woman to be awarded a PhD in literary history. The Swedish Academy hired her during the 1950s to write reports on the two Italian Nobel Prize in Literature nominees, Alberto Moravia and Riccardo Bacchelli.

Life 
Gunhild Bergh was born on 20 December 1888, in Gävle. She was the daughter of the chief physician of the county hospital, and his wife Alfhild Bergh. She had four siblings, Gunnar, Ragnar, Einar and Karin. She went to the coeducational Whitlockska skolan in Stockholm, receiving her school leaving certificate in 1907. She was admitted to Uppsala University in the same year to study literary history and languages. 

In 1911, she received her bachelor's degree and, in 1914, her licentiate in philosophy. On 26 May 1916 she defended her doctoral dissertation in literary history as the second Swedish woman to do so, on a thesis entitled "Litterär kritik i Sverige under 1600-1700-talen" (Literary criticism in Sweden during the 17th and 18th centuries). 

Bergh then devoted herself to studies of  Swedish naval officer, painter, author, and neo-classical architect, Carl August Ehrensvärd. In 1916 and 1917, she published several of his letters and stories in two volumes. 

She then started travelling to Rome, and continued to, until she decided to stay and live there from 1920. Between 1922 and 1925, she published Ehrensvärd's collected writings in three volumes. In addition to literary works, she also used to do news reporting for newspapers and magazines.

Gunhild Bergh remained unmarried throughout her life. She died on 10 September 1961, in Rome. She was buried at the Verano cemetery.

Publications
Bergh's publications included
C. A. Ehrensvärds brev (ed. 1916–1917)
Skrifter av Carl August Ehrensvärd (ed. 1922–1925)
Till Palestina (1947)

Bibliography

Additional references

See also 

 Hilma Borelius, the first Swedish woman to be awarded a PhD, also in literary history.

Further reading
 

1888 births
1961 deaths
Swedish literary historians
20th-century Swedish women writers
20th-century women writers
Swedish women journalists
Uppsala University alumni
Burials at Campo Verano